Democracy Now! is an hour-long American left-wing TV, radio, and Internet news program hosted by journalists Amy Goodman (who also acts as the show's executive producer), Juan González, and Nermeen Shaikh. The show, which airs live each weekday at 8 a.m. Eastern Time, is broadcast on the Internet and via more than 1,400 radio and television stations worldwide.

The program combines news reporting, interviews, investigative journalism and political commentary, with a focus on peace activism linked to environmental justice and social justice. It documents social movements, struggles for justice, activism challenging corporate power and operates as a watchdog outfit regarding the effects of American foreign policy. Democracy Now! views as its aim to give activists and the citizenry a platform to debate people from "The Establishment". The show is described as progressive by fans as well as critics, but Goodman rejects that label, calling the program a global newscast that has "people speaking for themselves". Democracy Now! describes its staff as "includ[ing] some of this country's leading progressive journalists."

Democracy Now Productions, the independent media nonprofit organization which produces Democracy Now!, is funded entirely through contributions from listeners, viewers, and foundations such as the Park Foundation, Ford Foundation, Lannan Foundation, and the J.M. Kaplan Fund. It has over $36 million in assets and about a $10 million annual budget.  Democracy Now! does not accept advertisers, corporate underwriting or government funding.  The show has become popular on the internet, and from the late 2010s onward, has been involved in pioneering extensive media cooperation in the public sphere across the US.

Background 

Democracy Now!, also called Democracy Now! The War and Peace Report, Democracy Now Independent Global News or Democracy News, was founded on February 19, 1996, at WBAI in New York City by journalists Amy Goodman, Juan González, Larry Bensky, Salim Muwakkil, and Julie Drizin. It originally aired on five Pacifica Radio stations. Goodman is the program's principal host, with Juan González and Nermeen Shaikh as frequent co-hosts. Jeremy Scahill, an investigative reporter and co-founding editor for The Intercept, has been a frequent contributor since 1997.

The show covered the Seattle protests (1999) targeting the World Trade Organization.

Democracy Now! partnered with Free Speech TV (FSTV) to cover the 2000 Democratic National Convention. Due to FSTV's satellite broadcast of the convention, the event marked a turning point for Democracy Now!, as in addition to its presence on radio, it became a television show. From then onward, Democracy Now! has had their content promoted and broadcast on FSTV.

Democracy Now! began broadcasting on television every weekday shortly after September 11, 2001, and is the only public media in the U.S. that airs simultaneously on satellite and cable television, radio, and the internet.

Democracy Now! has been critical of the Trans-Pacific Partnership (TPP) trade deal. After data disclosures by the whistleblower organisation WikiLeaks regarding the TPP in 2010, Democracy Now! has given a significant media platform and extensively covered them since, and like some other news networks cooperated with its leader Julian Assange. Coverage of WikiLeaks by Democracy Now! was sympathetic.

In 2011, reporter Sharif Abdel Kouddous covered the Egyptian revolution for Democracy Now!.

On February 19, 2016, Democracy Now! marked 20 years on the air with an hour-long retrospective look back at "two decades of independent, unembedded news", with highlights chosen from over 5,000 episodes. Amy Goodman also published a book entitled Democracy Now!: 20 Years Covering the Movements Changing America, and launched a 100-city tour across the United States to mark the 20th anniversary of Democracy Now!, with scheduled broadcasts of the show recorded during her travels.

Studios 

Democracy Now! began as a radio program broadcast from the studios of WBAI, a local Pacifica Radio station in New York City. In early September 2001, amid a months-long debate over the mission and management of Pacifica, Democracy Now! was forced out of the WBAI studios. Goodman took the program to the Downtown Community Television Center located in a converted firehouse building in New York City's Chinatown, where the program began to be televised. Only a few days later on September 11, 2001 Democracy Now! was the closest national broadcast to Ground Zero. On that day Goodman and colleagues continued reporting beyond their scheduled hour-long time slot in what became an eight-hour marathon broadcast. Following 9/11, in addition to radio and television, Democracy Now! expanded their multimedia reach to include cable, satellite radio, Internet, and podcasts.

In November 2009, Democracy Now! left their broadcast studio in the converted DCTV firehouse, where they had broadcast for eight years. The studio subsequently moved to a repurposed graphic arts building in the Chelsea District of Manhattan. In 2010, the new 8,500-square-foot Democracy Now! studio became the first radio or television studio in the nation to receive LEED Platinum certification, the highest rating awarded by the U.S. Green Building Council.

Syndication 
Democracy Now! is the flagship program of the Pacifica Radio network. It also airs on several NPR member stations. The television simulcast airs on public-access television and several PBS stations; by satellite on Free Speech TV and Link TV, and free-to-air on C Band. Democracy Now! is also available on the Internet as downloadable and streaming audio and video. In total, nearly 1,400 television and radio stations broadcast Democracy Now! worldwide.

Awards and reception 

Democracy Now! and its staff have received several journalism awards, including the Gracie Award from American Women in Radio & Television; the George Polk Award for its 1998 radio documentary Drilling and Killing: Chevron and Nigeria's Oil Dictatorship, on the Chevron Corporation and the deaths of two Nigerian villagers protesting an oil spill; and Goodman with Allan Nairn won Robert F. Kennedy Memorial's First Prize in International Radio for their 1993 report, Massacre: The Story of East Timor which involved first-hand coverage of genocide during the Indonesian occupation of East Timor.

On October 1, 2008, Goodman was named as a recipient of the 2008 Right Livelihood Award, in connection with her years of work establishing Democracy Now! and in 2009, she, like her frequent guest Glenn Greenwald, was awarded the first annual Izzy Award (named after journalist I. F. "Izzy" Stone) for "special achievement in independent media". Her co-host Juan González was inducted into the New York chapter of the Society of Professional Journalists' Hall of Fame on November 19, 2015.

2008 Republican National Convention arrests 
Three journalists with Democracy Now!—including principal host Amy Goodman, and news producers Nicole Salazar and Sharif Abdel Kouddous—were detained by police during their reporting on the 2008 Republican National Convention protests in Saint Paul, Minnesota. Salazar was filming as officers in full riot gear charged her area. As she yelled "Press!" she was knocked down and told to put her face in the ground while another officer dragged her backward by her leg across the pavement. The video footage of the incident was immediately posted on the Internet, leading to a large public outcry against her arrest. When a second producer, Kouddous, approached, he too was arrested, and charged with a felony. According to a press release by Democracy Now!, Goodman herself was arrested after confronting officers regarding the arrest of her colleagues. The officers had established a line of "crowd control", and ordered Goodman to move back. Goodman claims she was arrested after being pulled through the police line by an officer, and subsequently (as well as Kouddous) had her press credentials for the convention physically stripped from her by a Secret Service agent. All were held on charges of "probable cause for riot". A statement was later released by the city announcing that all "misdemeanor charges for presence at an unlawful assembly for journalists" would be dropped. The felony charges against Salazar and Kouddous were also dropped.

Goodman, Salazar, and Kouddous subsequently filed a lawsuit against the cities of St. Paul and Minneapolis as well as other defendants. According to Baher Asmy of the Center for Constitutional Rights, "[a]ll three plaintiffs that are journalists with Democracy Now reached a final settlement with the city of Minneapolis and St. Paul, and the United States Secret Service, that will resolve the claims that they had against them from unlawful and quite violent arrests." The settlement includes $100,000 in compensation and a promise of police training.

2016 North Dakota access pipeline protests 

In September 2016, an arrest warrant for criminal trespass was issued for Amy Goodman after covering for Democracy Now! the Dakota Access Pipeline protests during which guards unleashed dogs and pepper spray on protesters in Morton County, North Dakota. An arrest warrant was reportedly also issued for Green Party presidential candidate Jill Stein and her running mate, Ajamu Baraka.

Goodman elected to turn herself in. Three days before the court date, the charges were increased to engaging in a riot, which carried a penalty of up to 30 days in jail and a $1,500 fine. On October 17, 2016, the judge quickly dismissed the charges, but Morton County prosecutors insisted the case is still open and that they may pursue further charges in the future. Goodman asserted the importance of freedom of the press and said that Democracy Now! would continue covering the developing situation in North Dakota.

Notable guests, interviews, and on-air debates

Democracy Now! has featured appearances from Green party candidate Jill Stein during the 2016 United States presidential election.

Listenership 

According to a 2016–2017 Quantcast survey, "democracynow.org reaches over 395K U.S. monthly people".

See also 

 Alternative media
 Citizen journalism
 Citizen media
 Community radio
 Independent media
 Independent Media Center
 Mass media
 Media democracy
 Underground press

References

External links 
 
 
 

1996 radio programme debuts
Audio podcasts
American news radio programs
American television news shows
Anti-consumerist groups
American news websites
Mass media in New York City
Pacifica Foundation programs
Progressivism in the United States
Creative Commons-licensed podcasts
Association of Community Access Broadcasters
Public broadcasting in the United States
1996 establishments in the United States
2019 podcast debuts